Urtica incisa, commonly called scrub nettle, stinging nettle, and tall nettle, is an upright perennial herb native to streams and rainforest of eastern and southern Australia, from the north–east southwards through the east, of Queensland and New South Wales, then across the south, through Victoria, Tasmania, south-eastern South Australia and parts of southern Western Australia. Also widespread in the North and South Island of New Zealand.

Growth

Uses
Indigenous Australians ate the leaves after baking them between hot stones. They are considered a tasty vegetable, with colonists also using it to make a tonic for "clearing the blood".

References

Bushfood
Medicinal plants
incisa
Leaf vegetables
Flora of the Australian Capital Territory
Flora of New South Wales
Flora of Queensland
Flora of South Australia
Flora of Tasmania
Flora of Victoria (Australia)
Rosids of Western Australia